The Playboy Foundation is a corporate-giving organization that provides grants to non-profit groups involved in fighting censorship and researching human sexuality. It gives grants and in-kind contributions, such as advertising space in the Playboy magazine to organizations concerned with US First Amendment freedoms. The Playboy Foundation was founded in 1965.

References

External links
Official site

Foundations based in the United States
Playboy
1965 establishments in the United States
Organizations established in 1965